

Events
February 28 – Fire breaks out during a performance and destroys the Großherzoglichen Hoftheater in Baden. Most of the audience perishes because the theatre doors cannot be opened from the inside.
March 3 – I Lombardi alla prima crociata is performed at Palmo's Opera House in New York City, the first presentation of a Verdi opera in the United States.
March 14 – Verdi's Macbeth is premiėred at the Teatro della Pergola in Florence, Italy.
Franz Liszt gives up performing in public.
Vladimir Stasov publishes a monograph on Mikhail Glinka's use of folk motifs in his music.

Popular music
"Cantique de Noël" ("O Holy Night") w. (Fr) Placide Cappeau (Eng) John Sullivan Dwight m. Adolphe Adam
"Dinah Dear" by Philip Klitz
"Miss Ginger" by Philip Klitz
"Roll On Silver Moon" by Joseph W. Turner

Classical music
Franz Berwald – A Rustic Wedding
Frederic Chopin
Waltz Opus 64 No.1 (Minute)
Waltz Op. 64. No. 2
August Freyer – Concert Variations, Op.2
Franz Liszt 
Hungarian Rhapsody No. 2
Glanes de Woronince
 Most of the Harmonies poétiques et religieuses
Felix Mendelssohn – String Quartet No. 6
Jacques Offenbach – Concerto Militaire for cello and orchestra
Robert Schumann
Symphony No. 2
Piano Trio No. 1
Henryk Wieniawski – Grand Caprice Fantastique Op. 1

Opera
Francisco Asenjo Barbieri – Il Buontemponi
Giovanni Bottesini –  Cristoforo Colombo
Friedrich von Flotow –  Martha
Ivar Hallstrom – Hvita frun på Drottningholm (libretto by Frans Hedberg)
Karel Miry – Brigitta (opera in 3 acts, libretto by Hippoliet van Peene, premiered on June 27 in Ghent)
Giuseppe Verdi – Macbeth
William Vincent Wallace – Matilda of Hungary

Births
January 1 – Rudolf Tillmetz, flute virtuoso, music teacher and composer (d. 1915)
February 15 – Robert Fuchs, composer and music teacher (d. 1927)
March 2 – Richard Temple, singer, actor and theatre director (d. 1912)
March 9 – Axel Grandjean, conductor and composer (d. 1932)

June 28 – Sveinbjörn Sveinbjörnsson, composer (d. 1927)
July 12 – Karl Heinrich Barth, pianist and music teacher (d. 1922)
July 21 – Víctor Mirecki Larramat, cellist and music teacher (d. 1921)
October 21 – Giuseppe Giacosa, librettist for some of Puccini's operas (d. 1906)
November 1 – Emma Albani, soprano (d. 1930)
November 30 – August Klughardt, conductor and composer (d. 1902)
December 1 – Agathe Backer Grøndahl, pianist and composer (d. 1907)
December 9 – George Grossmith, comic writer and performer (d. 1912)
December 18 – Augusta Holmès, composer (d. 1903)
date unknown – Emma Fursch-Madi, operatic soprano (d. 1894)

Deaths
January 6 – Tyagaraja, Carnatic music composer (b. 1767)
April 23 – Erik Gustaf Geijer, writer and composer (b. 1783)
May 14 – Fanny Mendelssohn, pianist and composer (b. 1805; stroke)
June 11 – Heinrich Bärmann, clarinet virtuoso (b. 1784)
June 18 – Lisette Stenberg, actress and musician (b. 1770)
July 19 – Johann Wilhelm Wilms, composer (b. 1772)
September 4 – František Vladislav Hek, writer and composer (b. 1769)
September 25 – Emma Albertazzi, English contralto (b. 1814)
November 4 – Felix Mendelssohn, pianist, conductor and composer (b. 1809)
November 20 – Henry Francis Lyte, hymnist (born 1793)
date unknown – Cyrill Demian, piano and organ maker (b. 1772)
date unknown – Francesco Molino, guitarist and composer (b. 1775)

 
19th century in music
Music by year